Gregory Atta born Michael Atta (born 14 April 1815 in Zahle, Lebanon - died on 3 December 1899 in Damascus, Syria) was a bishop of the Melkite Greek Catholic Archeparchy of Homs, church historian and collector of antique manuscripts. He visited Europe in 1860–61 and campaigned among others for alms for the Oriental Christians in Bavaria (in the Roman Catholic dioceses of Augsburg, Wurzburg and Speyer). later served as a father of the First Vatican Council in Rome.

Life and work

Gregory Atta was baptized as Michael, the son of Melkite Catholic parents in Zahle, Lebanon. It is the third largest city of Lebanon, a Christian stronghold and is known in the Middle East as the "City of Wine and poet".

Ata sought the spiritual calling when he was ordained and became Oikonomus 1848 of the Melkite Patriarchate of Antioch in Damascus. As Patriarch officiated at this time was Maximos III. Mazloum (1833–1855), a learned, worldly-wise man who spent nearly 20 years in exile in Europe and the Melkite Church prospered greatly. Michael Ata belonged as an economist of Patriarchate to the Curia and to his personal environment.

Archbishop

Already on February 20, 1849 Ata received from the hand of the Patriarch Mazloum his episcopal consecration and became the Archbishop of the newly formed Melkite Greek Catholic Archeparchy of Homs, Hama and Yabroud". With the consecration Michael Ata took the name "Gregory". In addition to his pastoral duties Archbishop Ata collected ancient manuscripts and explored the Christian history in the Middle East, particularly of the Melkite Catholics.

Trip to Europe

In 1860 anti-Christian riots raged and killed some 30,000 believers and many churches and monasteries were looted and burned, and his diocese was one of the most strongly affected. Among those killed were three bishops and 30 priests and the beatified Franciscan . Due to the outstanding help of the Arab leader Abdelkader El Djezairi, although the rest could be restored, the formerly thriving Christian communities, however, were completely devastated. Gregory Ata decided together with other Eastern prelates at a time an unusual action. He drove the shores of Europe to collect urgently needed funds for the reconstruction of his diocese. In 1860 remained Ata in Vienna and 1861 he visited in the same intention, the Kingdom of Bavaria. From King Maximilian II of Bavaria the bishoprics were him to the Roman Catholic Diocese of Augsburg, Roman Catholic Diocese of Wurzburg and Roman Catholic Diocese of Speyer.

The Wiener Professor Friedrich Müller reported in 1898 in the "Melanges" for Charlez de Harlez, Liège canon and Orientalist professor at the Catholic University of Leuven, about his earlier meeting with Archbishop Ata:

"When in the year 1859/60 after the massacre in Damascus Metropolitan Gregorius Ata lived in the local Dominican monastery a long time, I became acquainted with him through the mediation of a higher clergy. The Rev. Mr., who knew no language other than Arabic, asked me to help him upon the application of a short Arab-German Vocabulars."

- Professor Friedrich Müller (linguist), "The origin of Indian script", in "Melanges de Charlez de Harlez" Catholic University of Leuven, 1898, pages 217/218.

In the Roman Catholic Diocese of Speyer Vicar General Johann Martin Foliot on 15 February 1861, serial no. 349 issued a circular to all parishes. In it, the then sad situation of Christians in the Middle East is portrayed again and goes on to say:

" ... we will notify all pastor and parish administrator of our diocese that the Greek uniierte Archbishop of Homs and Hamah in Syria, Gregory Ata will arrive in the next few days in Speyer and from here a series of Municipalities will be visited in our diocese to collect alms for the persecuted Christians. In our Bavarian fatherland several priests and bishops of Syria have now arrived and received from the King's Majesty the authorization personally to speak in different parts of the country for support. The reverend Archbishop Gregory Atta, preferably within whose jurisdiction the sword and fire of persecution raged, the Roman Catholic dioceses of Augsburg, Wurzburg and Speyer will be been instructed about this facts".

- Generali collection Diocese of Speyer, Circular No. 349, from 15 February 1861.

The clergy of the diocese are in the letter also invited the Oriental prelates "with word and deed at hand" to go. When visiting places Atta in the Bishopric of Speyer 18 cities were listed, namely: Speyer, Schifferstadt, Frankenthal, Forst, Deidesheim, Neustadt, Kaiserslautern, Landstuhl, St. Ingbert, Blieskastel, Zweibrücken, Maikammer, Edesheim, Landau, Herxheim, Rheinzabern, Rülzheim and Germersheim.

Roman Catholic Diocese of Speyer in 1864 reported on pages 182/183 back over the visit of the Syrian princes of the Church:

" Not found little sympathy in 1861 the Christians in Syria, which had beset by enemies hard and robbed, to meet their religious needs take the charity of their co-religionists to complete. The Most Reverend Archbishop Atta of Damascus, personally for this purpose, such as in the Bishopric of Speyer raised a Collecte for his unfortunate archdiocese in Bavaria, was pleased with the kindest inclusion in the visited him more important places of the bishopric with abundant gifts of love and also adopted by immediately be delivered to the Episcopal authority donations nor the sum of 1311 guilders in receiving."

- Schematism Diocese of Speyer, 1864, pages 182/183

Gregory Ata was apparently able to return with a very high amount donated in the home and the entire company proved not least the economic efficiency of the former economists of his ecclesiastical province.

In the essay "The legal relationships of the various rites within the Catholic Church" (Archives of Catholic Canon Law, Volume 7, page 339, Mainz 1864), stated Professor Joseph Hergenröther from Würzburg, later Cardinal, that he in the Archbishop Ata's occasion of his stay in Bavaria held a conversation that he described as "some interesting notes" owe.

By Gregory Atta's visit to the Diocese of Augsburg is noted also that he gave to the local Historical Society an old Turkish silver coin.

Late Years

In 1870 Archbishop Gregory Ata participated at I Vatican Council as a Council Father, and in part, said he was among the minority that was against the dogma of Papal infallibility voted.

Gregory Atta ruled his archdiocese for 50 years, until his death in 1899, and was succeeded by Archbishop Flavien Khoury. Ata resided in his last years in Yabroud  and died in Damascus. In 1886 named the priest Sylwanos Mansour (1854–1929) as his secretary; later he emigrated to Australia, where he earned a nationwide fame of main Melkite's pastor.

Fame

Gregory Atta was considered as having a profound knowledge of the Oriental Church's history and also wrote several works about it. In the "History of the Christian Arabic literature" by Georg Graf, 1953, he states that Archbishop Atta hada number of writings left behind, but of which only parts were published later. He was a "great bibliophile" "and collected many manuscripts, of which the greater number were scattered after his death"; but a part of the Atta's collection is still in Yabroud. These and Ata's writings were described by Archimandrite and church historian Joseph Nasrallah (1911–93) in 1937 as source material for his treatise "Manuscripts of the Yabroud Melkites".

Literature

 Georg Graf: "History of the Christian Arabic literature", issue 146, Biblioteca Apostolica Vaticana, 1953, page 288.
 Friedrich Müller: "The origin of Indian script", in "Melanges de Charlez de Harlez"., Catholic University of Leuven, 1898, Pages 217/218.
 Diözesanschematismus Speyer, 1864, pages 182 and 183.

References

External links
 

Melkite Greek Catholic bishops
Syrian archbishops
Syrian Melkite Greek Catholics
Historians of Christianity
Lebanese Melkite Greek Catholics
1815 births
1899 deaths
19th-century Syrian historians
People from Zahle
Participants in the First Vatican Council